Marat Safin was the defending champion, but lost in the second round to Vladimir Voltchkov.

Sébastien Grosjean won in the final 7–5, 6–4 against Mikhail Youzhny.

Seeds

  Andre Agassi (second round)
  Marat Safin (second round)
  Sébastien Grosjean (champion)
  Jiří Novák (withdrew because of a hamstring injury)
  Yevgeny Kafelnikov (second round)
  Younes El Aynaoui (first round)
  Gastón Gaudio (quarterfinals)
  Max Mirnyi (second round)
  Andrei Pavel (quarterfinals)

Draw

Finals

Top half

Bottom half

References
 2002 St. Petersburg Open Draw

St. Petersburg Open
2002 ATP Tour
2002 in Russian tennis